Arshaf (ارشاف ) is a village in northern Aleppo Governorate, northwestern Syria. It is located at 37.14439 36.43264 on the Queiq Plain, northeast of Azaz, and 1 km south of Dabiq.
The village has an irregular street layout but largely focuses on the main street running north south.
The village has seen sustained fighting in the Syrian Civil War.

References

Categories:Populated places in Azaz District

Towns in Aleppo Governorate